Selma Gürkan (1961) is a Turkish unionist and politician who has been the chairwoman of the Labour Party (EMEP) since 21 May 2011.

In 2015 Gürkan made a joint statement with Peoples' Democratic Party (HDP) leaders Selahattin Demirtaş and Figen Yüksekdağ addressing the perceived threats to political freedom in advance of the November elections, in which they called for a commitment to democratic rights.

In February 2018 Gürkan made a speech criticising Turkey's invasion of Afrin, Syria, and was arrested and held under charges of "spreading terrorist propaganda", for which she faces a possible prison sentence of 7 years. 15 other members of the party were arrested but later released for sharing anti-war in Afrin sentiments through social media posts. EMEP was itself banned in 2018 from putting up candidates for local election by the Supreme Electoral Council (YSK). Gürkan is quoted as saying the move was "totally arbitrary and antidemocratic," and the wider campaign of arrests as a threat to freedom of speech.

References

External links
Collection of all relevant news items at Haberler.com

1961 births
Living people
People from Ankara
Turkish socialists
Female party leaders of Turkey

Hoxhaists
Anti-revisionists